Peter Paustian is a German rower. He won a gold medal at the 1962 World Rowing Championships in Lucerne with the men's coxless four.

References

Year of birth missing (living people)
West German male rowers
World Rowing Championships medalists for West Germany
Possibly living people